The Ma'danid dynasty was an Islamic dynasty that ruled Makran from the late 9th or early 10th century until around the 11th century.

History

Makran had been one of the easternmost provinces of the Caliphate after its conquest by the Muslims in 644. In the 9th century, especially after the Abbasid dynasty's hold on the frontier provinces of the Caliphate began to weaken, Makran had been overrun by Kharijites. According to the historian Mas'ūdī the Kharijites were still a significant force in Makran by the time the Ma'danids took control there.

By the early 10th century the Banu Ma'dan had risen to power in Makran. They established their capital at Kiz/Kij and used the Indian title of Mahraj. Although seldom playing a major role in regional affairs, it was able to maintain its authority in Makran for at least a century and a half. At some point the Ma'danids became tributary to the Saffarid dynasty of Sistan. In 907/908 the Saffarid prince Al-Laith invaded Makran after 'Isa had gone into arrears on the required payments, and was able to compel the Ma'danid to give three years' worth of tribute.

Payments to the Saffarids lasted until the mid-10th century at the latest. In 971 the Buyid amir 'Adud al-Daula, who had recently conquered the bordering province of Kerman from the Banu Ilyas, compelled the Ma'danids to recognize Buyid suzerainty. Soon after this, however, the Ma'danids switched their loyalties to the Turkish ruler of Ghazni, Sebük Tigin, beginning nearly a century of allegiance to the Ghaznavid dynasty.

In the early 11th century the ruler of Makran was Ma'dan. After Ma'dan's death in 1025/1026 a succession dispute broke out among his two sons, 'Isa and Abu'l-'Askar Husayn. The Ghaznavid sultan Mahmud negotiated a settlement between the brothers, but it broke down when 'Isa rebelled against the Ghaznavids in 1029. Two years later Mahmud's son Mas'ud sent an army which killed 'Isa and installed Abu'l -'Askar Husayn in his place. The latter ruled Makran until after 1058 and was known as a man of learning. Some time after his death the power of the Ma'danids came to an end, presumably in the late 11th or 12th century.

See also
Makran
History of Balochistan
List of Sunni Muslim dynasties

Notes

References
Baloch, N.A. and Rafiqi, A.Q. "The regions of Sind, Baluchistan, Multan and Kashmir: the historical, social, and economic setting." History of Civilizations of Central Asia, Volume 4, Part 1. Ed. M.S. Asimov and C.E. Bosworth. New Delhi, India: Motilal Banarsidass Publishers, 1999. 
Bosworth, C.E. "The Early Ghaznavids." The Cambridge History of Iran, Volume 4: The Period From the Arab Invasion to the Saljuqs. Ed. R. N. Frye. New York, New York: Cambridge University Press, 1975. 
Bosworth, C.E. The History of the Saffarids of Sistan and the Maliks of Nimruz (247/861 to 949/1542-3). Costa Mesa, California: Mazda Publishers, 1994. 

Dynasties of Pakistan
Sunni dynasties